Ablie Jagne (died 23 December 2015) was a Gambian footballer who played for Real de Banjul and the Gambia national team as a defender.

References

1950s births
2015 deaths
Gambian footballers
Association football defenders
The Gambia international footballers
Real de Banjul FC players